Globalworth Tower, known previously as Bucharest One, is a class A office building that is located in the northern part of Bucharest, Romania, in the vicinity of Calea Floreasca, Barbu Văcărescu Boulevard and Pipera. The construction of the building started in 2014 and was completed in 2015 at a total cost of €60 million.

See also
List of tallest buildings in Romania
List of buildings in Bucharest
List of tallest buildings in Bucharest

References

Skyscraper office buildings in Bucharest
Office buildings completed in 2015
Amazon (company)
2012 establishments in Romania